The men's 1500 metre freestyle competition of the swimming event at the 2015 Southeast Asian Games was held on 10 June at the OCBC Aquatic Centre in Kallang, Singapore.

Records
Prior to this competition, the existing Asian and Games records were as follows:

The following records were established during the competition:

Schedule
All times are Singapore Standard Time (UTC+08:00)

Results

Final
This event was held in 2 Final sessions, both on 10 June.

Final 1

Final 2

Overall Finals Ranking

References

External links
 

Men's 1500 metre freestyle